Mălina Olinescu (29 January 1974 – 12 December 2011) was a Romanian singer who represented her country at the Eurovision Song Contest 1998 with the song "Eu cred" ("I Believe") and placed 22nd with six points, with all of her points coming from Israel. Olinescu died on 12 December 2011 at the age of 37. She committed suicide by falling out of the 6th-floor window in the building in which she lived.

References

External links 
 About Mălina Olinescu and the song "Eu cred" 
 Romania at the Eurovision song contest

1974 births
2011 suicides
Eurovision Song Contest entrants of 1998
Musicians from Bucharest
Eurovision Song Contest entrants for Romania
Romanian women singers
Suicides by jumping in Romania